Mount Thomas is a  mountain summit located in the Chugach Mountains, in the U.S. state of Alaska. Although modest in elevation, relief is significant since the eastern aspect of the mountain rises up from the tidewater of Prince William Sound's Valdez Narrows in approximately 1.5 miles. The mountain was named in 1898 by Captain William R. Abercrombie, presumably for General George Henry Thomas (1816–1870).

Climate

Based on the Köppen climate classification, Mount Thomas is located in a subarctic climate zone with long, cold, snowy winters, and mild summers. Weather systems coming off the Gulf of Alaska are forced upwards by the Chugach Mountains (orographic lift), causing heavy precipitation in the form of rainfall and snowfall. Temperatures can drop below −20 °C with wind chill factors below −30 °C. This climate supports an unnamed glacier on the north slope.

See also

List of mountain peaks of Alaska
Geography of Alaska
Charles Mitchell Thomas

References

External links
 Weather forecast: Mount Thomas
 Flickr: Mount Thomas photo

Thomas
Thomas
Thomas